The U.S.- Italy Fulbright Commission is a bi-national, non-profit organization promoting opportunities for study, research, and teaching in Italy and the United States through  competitive, merit-based grants. Since 1948, the commission acts as executor of the Fulbright Program to and from Italy.

The U.S.-Italy Fulbright Commission
Created in 1948, the U.S.-Italy Fulbright Commission is one of 50 bi-national organizations responsible for overseeing the international collaboration of the Fulbright Program, one of the most well-known and prestigious scholarship programs in the world.

The commission is governed by a Board of twelve members: six US members, nominated by the United States Ambassador to Italy, and six Italian members, nominated by the Italian Minister of Foreign Affairs.

The Italian Minister of Foreign Affairs and the United States Ambassador to Italy are honorary presidents of the commission.

The United States Department of State, the Bureau of Educational and Cultural Affairs, and the Italian Ministry of Foreign Affairs, General Directorate for Cultural Promotion and Cooperation and General Directorate for the Americas, ensure financial coverage and jointly manage the program.

The commission promotes study, research and lectureship opportunities in Italy and in the United States through Fulbright scholarships for Italian and American citizens (approximately 100 scholarships a year). It organizes and sponsors cultural and educational activities with both a national and international outreach and offers an Information Service on the Fulbright Program and on study and research opportunities in both the United States and Italy.

The Fulbright Program
Currently, the Fulbright Program is the largest program of international cultural exchanges in the United States. It was proposed by Senator J. William Fulbright of Arkansas. The program operates in more than 155 countries worldwide, with approximately 294,000 participants awarded over the course of 60 years. Awards vary between study programs, research or teaching in the United States and other participating countries. Each year, approximately 7,500 Fulbright scholarships are awarded.

Alumni 
According to the Fulbright website, the following individuals are notable alumni of the U.S.-Italy program:

Italian alumni 

 Giorgio Abetti †
 
 Simonetta Agnello Hornby
 Edoardo Amaldi †
 Giuliano Amato
 Franco Amatori
 Luigi Amerio †
 
 
 Antonio Armellini
 Alberto Asor Rosa † 
 Emilio Bajada †
 Sergio Balanzino †
 Laura Balbo
 
 Ruth Ben-Ghiat
 
 Lisa Biagiotti
  
 Lorenzo Bini Smaghi
 Dario Biocca
  †
 Remo Bodei †
 Luigi Boitani
 Piero Boitani
 Gaetano Borriello †
 Michele Bugliesi
 Liana Burgess †
 
 Elisabetta Brusa
 Sandro Calvani
  †
 Mario Calvo Platero
  †
  †
 Antonio Cassese †
 Sabino Cassese
 Lamberto Cesari †
  †
 Carlo M. Cipolla †
 Patrizio Civili
 Umberto Colombo †
  
  
 Luigi Dallapiccola †
  †
 Mario De Caro
 Giovanni De Micheli
  †
 Lamberto Dini
 Francesco D'Onofrio (politician)
 Umberto Eco †
  †
 Franco Ferrarotti 
 Alessandro Figà Talamanca 
 Bruno Finzi †
 Christian Filippella
 Luciano Fonda †
 Luigi Fontanella
 Carlo Forlivesi
 Francesco Paolo Fulci †
  †
 Roberto Gervaso  †
 Riccardo Giacconi  †
  †
  
  
 Aldo Giorgini †
 Paolo Giubellino
  
 Gino Giugni †
 Carlo Ginzburg 
 Dario Graffi †
 Francesco Grillo
 Margherita Hack †
 Francesco Iachello
 
 Emilio Insolera
 Humberto Insolera
 Antonio Mario La Pergola †
  †
  †
 Massimo Livi Bacci
 Luca Lombardi
  †
  
  †
  †
 Ugo Mattei
  †
 
 Carlo Minnaja
David Monacchi
  †
 Franco Moretti
 Simonetta Moro
 Loretta Napoleoni
  †
  
  †
 
 Manfredi Nicoletti †
 Michele Nicoletti
 Mario Oriani-Ambrosini †
 Gianfranco Pasquino
 Corrado Passera
 Marcello Pera
  †
 Giandomenico Picco
  †
  †
  †
 Carlo Ratti
 Tullio Regge  †
 Lucrezia Reichlin
  †
 Gianni Riotta
 Stefano Rodotà †
 Virginio Rognoni †
 Lucia Ronchetti
 Silvia Ronchey
  †
  †
 Mimmo Rotella  †
 Carlo Rubbia
 Giuseppe Sacco
 Luigi Salerno †
 Giorgio Salvini †
 Alberto Sangiovanni-Vincentelli
 Giovanni Sartori †
 Salvatore Settis
 Mario Sica
 Flavia Sparacino
  †
 Luigi Squarzina †
 Marco Stroppa
 Paolo Sylos Labini †
  †
  †
 Massimo Teodori
  †
 Irene Tinagli
Fabrizio Tonello
  †
 Vanni Treves †
 
 Alessandro Triulzi
 Domenicangela Lina Unali
 Paolo Valore
 Gian Berto Vanni †
 Christian Vassallo
 Umberto Vattani
 Lionello Venturi †
 Massimiliano Versace
 
 Vito Zagarrio
 
 Michele Zappella
 Federico Zeri †

U.S. alumni 
 
 Alfred C. Aman, Jr.
 Bumpei Akaji †
 Douglas Allanbrook †
 Putnam Aldrich †
 Herbert L. Anderson †
 Dominick Argento †
 Kenneth Arrow †
 Leonard J. Arrington †
 Jerome A. Barron
 Khadra Bashir Ali †
 Pranab Bardhan
 Denver Michelle Beattie
 Robert Beauchamp †
 J. Bowyer Bell †
 Arthur Asa Berger
 Steve Bickerstaff  †
 Norman Birnbaum †
 Lee Bontecou †
 Daniel J. Boorstin †
 Samuel Bowles (economist)
 David Brion Davis †
 Eric Britton †
 James M. Buchanan †
 Noel DaCosta †
 Edmond Casarella †
 Nicolas Carone †
 Diana Cavallo †
 Francesco Cesareo
 Debra Cheverino
 Dale Chihuly
 William J. Connell (historian)
 Aaron Copland †
 Domenic Cretara †
 Frederick Crews
 Dan Dailey (glass artist)
 James Dashow
 Stephen De Staebler †
 Peter Diamond 
 David DiChiera †
 Niels Diffrient †
 Spencer M. Di Scala
 Lois Dodd
 Grant Drumheller
 Norman Dyhrenfurth †
 John Eaton (composer) †
 Shirlee Emmons †
 Nader Engheta
 Richard Faith †
 Daniel Ferro †
 Leslie Fiedler †
 Robert O. Fink †
 Marshall Fishwick †
 Maryellen Fullerton
 Bianca Garcia
 Angelo Garzio †
 Milton Gendel †
 Joseph Giardina †
 Gregory Gillespie †
 Milton Glaser  †
 Myron Goldsmith †
 James Green (educator) †
 Eugene P. Gross †
 Elaine Hamilton-O%27Neal †
 Susan Harbage Page
 James Higginbotham †
 Theodore Holmes Bullock †
 Raymond F. Hopkins
 L. Thomas Hopkins †
 Peter Hujar †
 Edgar Hull †
 Ada Louise Huxtable †
 Wolf Kahn †
 Richard Karpen
 James E. Katz
 John Kearney (artist) †
 Murray Kempton †
 David Kertzer
 William King (artist) †
 George Kish †
 Karl Klare
 Barbara Knowles Debs
 Karl Korte †
 Herbert Kubly †
 Allen Kurzweil
 Frank Judge †
 Gabriel Laderman †
 Joseph La Palombara †
 Linda Lappin
 Irving Lavin †
 Lynne Lawner
 Stanford Lehmberg †
 Alan Lelchuk
 Richard S. Levy †
 Pamela O. Long
 Alvin Lucier †
 Lorin Maazel †
 Sabina Magliocco
 Jules Maidoff
 Judith Malafronte
 Richard Marquis
 Donald Martino †
 Berthe Marti †
 Emily Mason †
 Bob McMath
 Howard McParlin Davis †
 Maaza Mengiste
 Richard Miller (singer) †
 Andrea Modica
 Franco Modigliani †
 Anna Moffo †
 William Morgan (architect) †
 Mark Musa †
 Anna Nagurney
 Robert Neffson
 Louis J. Nigro, Jr. †
 Louis Owens †
 Revilo P. Oliver †
 Robert Pack (poet and critic)
 Anne Paolucci †
 Philip Pearlstein †
 Michael J. Piore
 Sylvia Poggioli
 Daniel Pollack
 Andreas Poulimenos
 Larry Pressler
 Robert Putnam
 Joseph Raffael †
 Francis J. Ricciardone, Jr.
 Theodore Roethke †
 Kait Rhoads
 David Rosand †
 Richard Rosecrance
 Robert A. Rosenstone
 Robert Royal (author)
 Frederic Rzewski †
 Frederick P. Salvucci
 Ellis Sandoz
 Alberto Sbacchi †
 Emilio Segrè †
 Richard Serra
 Salvatore Scibona
 Thomas Robert Shannon Broughton †
 Sarai Sherman †
 Taije Silverman
 Larry R. Smith
 Richard E. Spear
 Dominic J. Squatrito †
 Thaddeus Strassberger
 Jack Stauffacher †
 Michael Steinberg (music critic) †
 Jeffrey C. Stewart
 Mark Strand †
 Gregory Sumner
 Nina Tandon
 Webster Tarpley
 Richard Teitelbaum †
 Paul Thek †
 John Thow †
 Rudolph Edward Torrini †
 Garner Tullis †
 Peter Vaghi
 Hal Varian
 Peter Viereck †
 Octavia Waldo
 William Weaver †
 Arnold Weinstein †
 William Westney
 Oliver Williamson  †
 Betty Woodman †
 L. Randall Wray
 Charles Wright (poet) 
 Peyton Young 
 Arlene Zallman †
 Astra Zarina †

Notes

External links 
 

Italy–United States relations
International friendship associations